The 1923–24 season of Atromitos F.C. was the 1st in the club's history, thus they did not participate in a league, but they played a friendly game.

The chairman of the team was Andreas Tsouroutsoylou, the person that created the club.

Friendly Game

References

"Flutter in Glory" by Pavlos Katonis

1923-24
Greek football clubs 1923–24 season